This is a list of episodes from the ninth and final season of Alice.

Episodes

Broadcast history
Alice began the season airing Sunday nights at 9:30-10:00 pm (EST) on  October 14, 1984, before it was moved to the 8:30-9:00 pm (EST) Tuesday night time slot on January 8, 1985, where it remained through February 5. In airing a two-part episode story, it also aired the next evening, Wednesday February 6, before returning to its Tuesday night timeslot, where it remained for the remainder of the TV season.

References

1984 American television seasons
1985 American television seasons